Aurela Nerlo (born 11 February 1998) is a Polish racing cyclist, who currently rides for Massi - Tactic Women Team. She rode in the women's time trial event at the 2017 UCI Road World Championships, and took 4th place at the UEC European Under-23 Road Championships.

References

External links

1998 births
Living people
Polish female cyclists
People from Głogów
21st-century Polish women